Balder the Brave is a fictional character appearing in American comic books published by Marvel Comics. The character is based on the deity Baldr from Norse mythology.

Publication history

Created by editor-plotter Stan Lee and penciller Jack Kirby, Balder first appeared in Journey into Mystery #85 (October 1962).

Fictional character biography
 

One of the Norse gods of Asgard, Balder is the half brother of Thor, companion to the Warriors Three, and a loyal follower and son of Odin, ruler of the gods.

Balder warned Thor about Skagg the Storm Giant and the fire demon Surtur being released by Loki who planned for them to kill Odin after being told by Heimdall. Balder has aided Thor against many of his foes, such as Thor's adopted brother, Loki; the Executioner and Enchantress; the Enchanters Three; the Wrecker; and Mangog. Balder is also briefly named ruler of Asgard during Thor's quest to find a then missing Odin.

Balder is beloved by most who know him. When threatened with execution for ignoring the call of battle for the sake of a fallen bird, his men begged Odin to take one of their lives instead.

Like the mythological version, the Marvel version of Balder is the catalyst that will trigger Ragnarök and end Asgard. To prevent this, Odin cast spells to keep Balder invulnerable. This almost happens when Loki had the blind god Hoder accidentally kill Balder with a mistletoe arrow, but is averted by the planning of Odin, who creates a shield around Balder's pyre, and later restores Balder to life when the Asgardians, after being slain in battle with the Celestials, were brought back to life by Thor using portions of energy donated by other Gods. On the second occasion, however, Balder is traumatized by the experience as he saw the souls of all those he had slain in battle and renounced killing. It is later revealed that in order to escape Hel, Balder was forced by Hela to kill all of those "tens of thousands" he had previously slain in battle again, in an epic confrontation that lasted so long Balder's hair had turned white when he finally emerged victorious. Volstagg of the Warriors Three takes it upon himself to become Balder's boon friend in an attempt to lift him out of his long depression. While Balder treasures the friendship, Volstagg's efforts do little to cheer him. Balder also has a love-hate relationship with Karnilla, the Queen of the Norns, who has aided both Loki and Asgard at times; on one occasion Karnilla forces Balder to renounce Odin and serve her, whilst on another she joins forces with Asgard against Surtur at Balder's request. Her emotions are roused during Balder's deep depression as she feels Loki has ruined a unique member of the Asgardians. Karnilla's lust for Balder inadvertently causes the death of Balder's love, Nanna - an act that Balder has never forgotten.

Balder later accepts the warrior part of himself and goes on to save Karnilla's people from a rogue giant's spell. Balder and all other Asgardians (with the exception of Thor) eventually perish during the final Ragnarok, although he is later found inhabiting the armor of the Destroyer.

Loki reveals that Balder is the son of Odin and Frigga and the half brother of Thor, meaning he is then made a prince of Asgard. When Thor is forced to kill his reborn grandfather Bor, Loki coerces Balder - now a royal prince - into exiling the Thunder God. Balder then assumes the throne of Asgard. When Loki has the Asgardians moved to Latveria, he is shown at a banquet held by Doctor Doom. Balder asked why they could not invite Thor as well, since the Asgardians were now in Latveria. Loki calmed Balder down to prevent Doctor Doom from reacting to the comment. Balder meets a diner owner named Bill (who fell in love with Kelda and followed her to Latveria) and gives him a cloak to keep warm. Balder later witnesses Bill's assault by Loki's henchmen, upon Bill having discovered the evil nature of Loki's scheme with Doctor Doom. After fending them off, Bill dies in Balder's arms having Balder tell Kelda that he loves her and telling Balder about Loki's plot. Balder and the other Asgardians retaliate even after Doctor Doom kills Kelda. Balder and the other Asgardians are forced to fight Endrik (who has been modified with technological implants) and many other mutilated Asgardians. Balder and the other Asgardians continued their fight with the mutilated Asgardians while Thor battled Doctor Doom. Balder kills the mutilated Asgardians in order to get to Kelda's heart. After Loki restores Kelda to life and Thor defeats Doctor Doom's Destroyer armor, Balder leads the Asgardians back to Broxton, Oklahoma. Back in Asgard, Balder is concerned over his foolishness over allowing what transpired in Latveria to happen. Loki assures him he is a fine king.

During the Siege storyline, Loki warns Balder that Norman Osborn is rallying up an army to invade Asgard following the incident with Volstagg and the U-Foes at Soldier Field. Balder is later informed about the situation with Volstagg by Hogun and Fandral. When Captain America arrives with the New Avengers and the Secret Warriors, Balder is pleased at the fact that Thor's allies have joined the battle. Balder remains King of Asgard after the failed Siege, but is stricken with great guilt, believing his rule has led to nothing but ruin, but Thor persuades him to remain monarch and accept him as his new Chief Advisor.

Balder attends the Council of Godheads convened to counter the imminent universal threat of the Chaos King and his impending Chaos War, to decide which mortal paragon they would choose to combat Mikaboshi. Vali Halfling later appears to the Council and challenges them to disprove their own impotence by stopping him before he himself attained godhood, and Balder tells Anansi that Halfling was the son of Loki and banished to Midgard long ago. When the Chaos War at long last nears Earth, the Council summons Hercules, Amadeus Cho and Delphyne Gorgon before them and commands them to bow before their authority; in return, the newly restored and empowered Hercules fights and easily bests most of them, including Balder himself with a single rage-fueled blow.

After the Underworld is overthrown by Mikaboshi, and Hela and Pluto are overwhelmed by his devastating forces, Balder calls for the Council to fight alongside him against the Chaos King, only for the Japanese sun goddess Amaterasu to seal the throne room of the Celestial Axis, the latter claiming that if he went now, Mikaboshi would be able to trace him back to the Axis and subsequently invade all their realms, but promising that they will aid Hercules and Thor in their "own time". However, Mikaboshi breaks into the Celestial Axis after Hercules pierced the veil shielding it, and launches an assault on all of Earth's pantheons, seemingly decimating all of them with brutal ease and slaughtering many of the deities, although Balder is one of the survivors and later encounters Hercules.

Powers and abilities
Balder is said to be the fastest and most agile of all Asgardian warriors, with his speed being rivaled only by Hermod. Thor once notes that Balder is able to move faster than the "speed of light" and realizes that Balder is too fast for him to strike a blow and so must use his lightning to disarm him (and break the spell three troll witches had cast upon him). Balder possesses superhuman strength superior to the average Asgardian male and like all Asgardians, superhuman endurance and longevity (via the Golden Apples of Idunn). He is immune to all Earthly diseases and has some resistance to magic. Courtesy of a spell cast by his mother and Asgardian goddess Frigga to try to avert Ragnarök, Balder is almost totally invulnerable while within the Asgardian dimension, unable to suffer harm from virtually any living or non-living being. Any projectile hurled at Balder which is capable of killing or injuring an Asgardian is magically deflected from its path before it can strike him; however, he can be injured or killed by weapons made of mistletoe wood, or if he wills himself to be vulnerable. Balder could also die in the Asgardian dimension through means that do not involve weaponry: for example, he could starve to death or be asphyxiated; presumably he can also be harmed by the power of Odin, and possibly by spells and magical energies used by others. It is not known whether Balder also becomes vulnerable when he is in dimensions other than those of Asgard and Earth.

Being the Asgardian god of light, after a period of intense training, Balder can also generate intense light and heat strong enough to melt the entire fortress of Utgard-Loki and reduce him and his fellow Frost Giants down to tiny size, an ability he has been shown to retain even on Midgard even after many months, as shown in the events of Siege, albeit possibly with the aid of his enchanted blade, can communicate with animals, and has also demonstrated minor magical talents on rare occasions, such as shielding himself from mortal eyesight while flying to Earth on Odin's steed in one instance, sensing that Thor was in danger on Earth while in Asgard, or teleporting himself and Sif (without the use of the latter's enchanted sword) to Earth from Asgard in another. However, though Balder can project some degree of energy, unlike most of his brethren, his ability to do so is nevertheless far lesser to that of the other gods of light in other pantheons (namely Apollo, who can control at least double the amount of energy as Balder). He is also a highly skilled weapons master (wielding the enchanted sword of Frey, capable of fighting of its own accord) with millennia of extensive experience and training, and is a proficient tactician and master horseman, having been entrusted with several special missions by Odin.

Balder becomes a member of Earth's Council of Godheads following Thor's banishment.

Reception
 In 2022, Screen Rant included Balder the Brave in their "10 Marvel Comics Gods Who Should Join The MCU Next" list.

Other versions

Earth X
In the alternate Earth X reality, the Asgardians were actually aliens that were manipulated by the Celestials into believing they were the Gods of Norse myth. When the lie was revealed, "Balder" and the other Asgardians briefly resumed their alien form, but later returned to their Asgardian forms. Thor and Loki plotted to overthrow Odin through the legendary Ragnarok, which foretold that Balder would fall in battle against the Midgard Serpent. However, Odin foiled their plot and kept Balder alive.

Marvel Zombies
In the Marvel Zombies alternate universe, Balder is one of many heroes who attends Nick Fury's briefing on how to deal with the zombie plague.

MC2
An older version of Balder existed in the MC2 universe, who died to protect Thor in his battle against Galactus.

Ultimate Marvel
Balder first appears in the Ultimate Marvel Universe in the prequel limited series Ultimate Comics: Thor issue 2. Balder Odinson is one of the three sons of Odin, who helped end the war between Asgard and Jotunheim with help from his brothers, Loki and Thor. Of the three, Balder was the better fighter and he was also the All-Seeing Eye of Odin. He was killed by Loki when he tried to stop his brother from stealing the Norn Stones out of Odin's chamber. He later was resurrected in human form by Odin. As a human, Balder lives under the name of Donald Blake, and is later seen helping Thor out in the European Defense Initiative, by convincing the scientists that Thor's claims to be a God are genuine. He convinces Thor to take up the technology that simulates his godlike powers and use it to fulfil his role as a hero. He is later killed in Ultimate Comics: Ultimates, along with most other Asgardians.

In other media

Television
 Balder appears in "The Mighty Thor" segment of The Marvel Super Heroes, voiced by Chris Wiggins.
 Balder made a cameo appearance in the Spider-Man and His Amazing Friends episode "The Vengeance of Loki!".
 Balder appears in The Avengers: Earth's Mightiest Heroes, voiced by Nolan North.
 Balder appears in The Super Hero Squad Show episode "Lo, How the Mighty Hath Abdicated", voiced by Travis Willingham.
 Balder appears in the M.O.D.O.K. episode "Tales from the Great Bar-Mitzvah War!", in which he is accidentally killed by M.O.D.O.K. via a shredder.

Film
Balder appears in Hulk vs. Thor, voiced by Michael Adamthwaite.

Video games
Balder appears in Marvel: Ultimate Alliance, voiced by Dave Wittenberg.

Merchandise
Balder received a figurine in The Classic Marvel Figurine Collection.

Collected editions

References

External links
 
 The Official Site for Thor Comics

Baldr
Characters created by Jack Kirby
Characters created by Stan Lee
Comics characters introduced in 1964
Fictional characters who can manipulate light
Fictional characters with fire or heat abilities
Fictional characters with superhuman durability or invulnerability
Fictional gods
Fictional swordfighters in comics
Marvel Comics Asgardians
Marvel Comics characters who can move at superhuman speeds
Marvel Comics characters who use magic
Marvel Comics characters with accelerated healing
Marvel Comics characters with superhuman strength
Marvel Comics male superheroes
Marvel Comics superheroes